Neobeguea is a genus of flowering plants belonging to the family Meliaceae.

It is native to Madagascar.

The genus name of Neobeguea is in honour of Louis Henri Bégué (1906–1979), French civil servant in the forestry service in Madagascar. 
It was first described and published in J. Agric. Trop. Bot. Appl. Vol.17 on page 232 in 1970.

Known species
According to Kew:
Neobeguea ankaranensis 
Neobeguea leandriana 
Neobeguea mahafaliensis

References

Meliaceae
Meliaceae genera
Plants described in 1970
Endemic flora of Madagascar